The Men's Road Race of the 2011 UCI Road World Championships cycling event took place on 25 September 2011 in Copenhagen, Denmark.

In a sprint to the finish line, Great Britain's Mark Cavendish became world champion after making his move down the right-hand side of the course, and just managed to hold off the rest of the field, to become his country's first road race world champion since Tom Simpson won the event in San Sebastián in 1965. The silver medal went to Australia's Matthew Goss – a team-mate of Cavendish on the  team – with the bronze medal going to Germany's André Greipel.

Route
The race started in the square at Copenhagen City Hall. For the second consecutive time, the World Championship route started and finished in different locations, with the riders completing  – including a  neutralised section – before reaching the finishing circuit in Rudersdal.

Race report
Finally a breakaway formed, which consisted of seven riders: in the break were Oleg Chuzhda, Maxim Iglinsky, Tanel Kangert, Robert Kišerlovski, Pablo Lastras, Christian Poos and Anthony Roux. As the lead rose up to eight minutes, the Great Britain team began to increase the pace of the peloton to start chasing the group and lower their lead. The lead was brought back to about four minutes, mainly due to the work of Steve Cummings and David Millar.

At that point, a first attack came from the main group at the end of the eleventh lap. Johan Vansummeren accelerated and took Yoann Offredo and Luca Paolini with him. Soon after they were joined by Olivier Kaisen and Simon Clarke. These five riders began to eat into the lead break's advantage, with Offredo staying mostly at the back of the line with his teammate Roux up ahead.

Both groups ahead merged, creating a group of eleven riders at the front, as Christian Poos had dropped out and fell back into the peloton. The peloton itself, still being led by the British, had split as result of a fall in the thirteenth lap, causing some big names to fall back and never catch up with the main pack, including amongst others the defending champion Thor Hushovd, 2011 time trial world champion Tony Martin and quick finisher Greg Van Avermaet.

The pack closed the gap to about one minute, with several riders trying to bridge the gap between the peloton and the leading bunch in small groups. Eventually all riders were brought back, with Anthony Roux surviving the longest, only to be caught by his countryman Thomas Voeckler as he stormed past to form a new leading group in the penultimate lap together with Nicki Sørensen and Klaas Lodewyck. These three never got more than 25 seconds and were held very close by the peloton. Johnny Hoogerland managed to bridge the gap to the leaders, but was caught together with the three a few kilometres later. No riders managed to get away from the bunch after that, allowing Mark Cavendish to finish the work of his teammates in the sprint. Matthew Goss was a close second, while André Greipel needed a photo finish to hold off Fabian Cancellara for bronze. Jürgen Roelandts completed the top five.

National qualification
After a meeting of the UCI Management Committee on 28 January 2011, the qualification system for the 2011 road race remained unchanged from 2010. Results from January to the middle of August would count towards the qualification criteria on both the UCI World Tour and the UCI Continental Circuits across the world, with the rankings being determined upon the release of the numerous tour rankings on 15 August 2011.

UCI World Tour
The top ten nations in the UCI World Tour rankings by individual nations, may register up to fourteen different riders, of which nine could compete in the event. A nation with less than nine riders in the individual classification of the UCI World Tour rankings would only be allowed to start the race with the number of riders that were classified. If this number is less than six, the country would still allocate six riders for the competition; but could still reach the original allocation via the Continental Circuits. Prior to that re-allocation, any unused allocations within the top ten placings are re-allocated to countries that were ranked eleventh downwards on 15 August 2011, until the places were filled. Other countries could also enter teams into the race through individual riders in the World Tour rankings, if they had at least one rider in the top 100 placings overall, or had one rider listed outside the top 100, but still ranked.

UCI Continental Circuits
In each of the five continental tours held beneath the UCI World Tour, places could be earned through the rankings by nation. As many as sixteen places were offered through one of these continental tours – through the UCI Europe Tour – to as few as the overall winner of the UCI Oceania Tour. Similar to the UCI World Tour, other countries could also enter teams into the race through individual riders in their continental rankings, if they had at least one rider ranked overall.

Entrants by country

Final classification

References

External links

Men's road race
UCI Road World Championships – Men's road race